Guy Walks into a Bar... is the third album by American band Mini Mansions, released on July 26, 2019. It includes the single "GummyBear".

Background 
The album's recording started in December 2015 and, as the band members were occupied with separate projects—such as Michael Shuman in Queens of the Stone Age and Zach Dawes and Tyler Parkford playing live with The Last Shadow Puppets and Arctic Monkeys—recording was finished in 2018. It was written with a "narrative about love in mind", and vocalist Michael Shuman based the lyrics off a relationship he had, "from beginning honeymoon phase jitters to the process of breaking up".

The singles off the record were first played when Mini Mansions opened for Arctic Monkeys on the Australia/ New Zealand leg of the Tranquility Base Hotel and Casino tour.

Reception 

Guy Walks into a Bar... has received generally positive reviews by critics with a total score of 79/100 on Metacritic, with Roisin O'Connor of The Independent writing that the album features "sprawling, psychedelic pop to scuzzy post-punk and rock references" and has a "superb dynamic that holds the listener's attention, while the band navigate through a single, tumultuous relationship". Clash called the album an "infectious return, one delivered with confidence and panache. The band's superb songwriting remains intact, while the production has been amplified soaking up fresh elements in the process."

Track listing

References 

2019 albums
Mini Mansions albums
Fiction Records albums